Serena Williams defeated Victoria Azarenka in the final, 6–2, 2–6, 7–5 to win the women's singles tennis title at the 2012 US Open. Azarenka served for the championship and led 5–3 in the third set. It was the first time since 1995 that the final went to three sets. With the victory, Williams became the third woman in history to win Wimbledon, the Olympics, and the US Open in the same season, after Steffi Graf and her sister Venus Williams. Williams lost only one set during the tournament, to Azarenka in the final.

Samantha Stosur was the defending champion, but was defeated in the quarterfinals by Azarenka.

Three-time US Open champion Kim Clijsters, who was on a 22-match winning streak at the tournament, lost to Laura Robson in the second round. This was also Clijsters' last tournament before her second retirement (her first being in 2007), until she returned to the tour in 2020 at the Dubai Tennis Championships.

This marked the first major main draw appearance for future two-time major champion and world No. 1 Garbiñe Muguruza, who lost to Sara Errani in the first round. It was also the first major main draw appearance for future WTA Finals champion Elina Svitolina, who lost to Ana Ivanovic in the first round. This also marked the first time Ivanovic reached the quarterfinals of a major since winning the 2008 French Open.

Seeds

Qualifying

Main draw

Finals

Top half

Section 1

Section 2

Section 3

Section 4

Bottom half

Section 5

Section 6

Section 7

Section 8

Championship match statistics

References

External links
Main Draw
2012 US Open – Women's draws and results at the International Tennis Federation

2012 US Open (tennis)
US Open (tennis) by year – Women's singles
2012 in women's tennis
2012 in American women's sports